Ieu Pannakar (21 February 1931 – 10 May 2018) was a Cambodian film director and statesman. Among the first Cambodians to study film making, he was one of Cambodia's pioneering film directors. He was a co-founder (with fellow Cambodian director Rithy Panh) of Bophana: The Audio-Visual Resource Center - Cambodia.

Pannaker served in the Senate of Cambodia, as a nominee of King Norodom Sihamoni. He has also headed the cinematic division of the Cambodian Ministry of Culture and Fine Arts. He was the son of former Prime Minister of Cambodia Ieu Koeus.

References

External links
 Bophana: Audio Visual Resource Center – Cambodia

1931 births
2018 deaths
Cambodian film directors
Members of the Senate (Cambodia)
Children of prime ministers of Cambodia